Cryptolechia rectimarginalis is a moth in the family Depressariidae. It was described by Wang in 2006. It is found in Yunnan, China.

The length of the forewings is 18.5–20 mm. The forewings are dark brown, the costal margin with a yellow spot at two-fifths and another at one-fourth, as well as a black spot at the middle of the cell, the end of the cell and the middle of the fold. The hindwings are grey.

Etymology
The species name refers to the straight distal margin of the valva and is derived from Latin rect (meaning straight) and marginalis (meaning margin).

References

Moths described in 2006
Cryptolechia (moth)